Reggio di Calabria Santa Caterina railway station is a railway station of the Italian city of Reggio Calabria, Calabria. Part of the Battipaglia–Reggio di Calabria railway, it serves the quartiere of Santa Caterina and the port of Reggio.

History 
The station was opened as an infill station on January 18, 1989.

Layout 
The station has four tracks, two side platforms and one island platform. Part of the station, particularly the north side platform and the island platform, is located under the spur route Sopraelevata Porto. The station also has toilet.

Services 
The station is served by regional and suburban trains operated by Trenitalia.

References

External links

Railway stations in Calabria
Railway stations opened in 1989
1989 establishments in Italy
Railway stations in Italy opened in the 20th century